Avignon TGV (IATA: XZN) is a railway station located in Avignon, France. It was opened on 10 June 2001 and is located on the LGV Méditerranée high-speed line and Avignon-Centre–Avignon TGV railway. The train services are operated by the SNCF. The station is located 6 km south of the city centre.

Overview
This station has two platforms for trains calling at the station, with two through lines. This allows trains not stopping at Avignon to pass through at full speed, but away from passenger platforms.

This station, inaugurated in 2001, was designed by the cabinet of architecture of the SNCF under the direction of Jean-Marie Duthilleul and Jean-François Blassel. It has a 340 m (1,115 ft)-long glazed roof that has been compared to that of a cathedral.

On 15 December 2013 a link line between Avignon's city station and Avignon's high speed station opened, with a regular shuttle service operating between the two.

Train services
The station is served by the following services:

From Avignon TGV train services depart to major French cities such as: Paris, Lyon, Marseille, Cannes, Nice, Dijon, Strasbourg, Montpellier, Nantes, Rennes and Lille.

International services operate to Belgium: Brussels, Antwerp (in summer), Germany: Frankfurt, Spain: Barcelona, Madrid, Switzerland: Geneva and The Netherlands: Amsterdam (in summer).

High-speed services (TGV) Paris - Avignon - Marseille
High-speed services (TGV) Paris - Avignon - Cannes - Nice
High-speed services (TGV Ouigo) Marne-la-Vallée - Lyon Saint-Exupéry - Avignon - Marseille
High-speed services (TGV) Lille - Aeroport CDG - Lyon - Avignon - Marseille
High-speed services (TGV) Brussels - Lille - Aeroport CDG - Lyon - Avignon - Marseille
High-speed services (TGV/ICE) Frankfurt - Strasbourg - Mulhouse - Belfort - Lyon - Avignon - Marseille
High-speed services (TGV) Strasbourg - Mulhouse - Belfort - Lyon - Avignon - Marseille
High-speed services (TGV) Nancy - Strasbourg - Besançon - Dijon - Lyon - Avignon - Marseille - Cannes  - Nice
High-speed services (TGV) Nantes - Angers - Tours - Lyon - Avignon - Marseille
High-speed services (TGV) Rennes - Le Mans - Lyon - Avignon - Marseille
High-speed services (TGV) Le Havre - Rouen - Lyon - Valence - Avignon - Marseille
High-speed services (TGV) Geneva - Lyon - Avignon - Marseille
High-speed services (AVE) Madrid - Barcelona - Perpignan - Montpellier - Avignon - Marseille

High-speed services (Thalys) Amsterdam - Rotterdam - Antwerp - Brussels - Avignon - Aix-en-Provence - Marseille (Summer Saturdays)
Shuttle services (TER PACA) Avignon - Avignon TGV
Local services (TER PACA) Marseille - Miramas - Cavaillon - Avignon - Avignon TGV
Local services (TER PACA) Carpentras - Avignon - Avignon TGV

Additionally in the summer months Thalys provide services between Amsterdam and Brussels.

Trivia

Parts of the 2007 film "Mr Bean's Holiday" were shot at Gare d'Avignon.

Gallery

See also
 List of TGV stations

References

External links

 

Gare d'Avignon TGV
Railway stations in Vaucluse
Railway stations in France opened in 2001
Avignon